Claude Fagedet (30 March 1928 – 26 June 2017) was a French photographer. He took many photographs of Occitanie, including his hometown of Narbonne and the chalets in Gruissan. He also took photographs on his many trips abroad. He was awarded the Meilleur Ouvrier de France.

References

1928 births
2017 deaths
People from Narbonne
French photographers
20th-century photographers
21st-century photographers